Indonesia is home to over 1,300 ethnic groups, some who have their own belief system and mythology. The following is a list of Indonesian deities.

Balinese

Acintya - Supreme God
Batara Kala - god of the underworld
Dewi Danu - goddess of the lakes
Dewi Ratih - goddess of the moon
Dewi Sri - goddess of rice and prosperity

Local Chinese
Chen Fu Zhen Ren, worshiped by Chinese, Javanese and Balinese in East Java and Bali.
Ze Hai Zhen Ren, worshiped by Chinese of Tegal, Central Java.

Javanese
Batara Guru - avatar of Hindu god Shiva and ruler of the Kahyangan, god of revelations
Batara Sambu - god of teachers
Batara Kala - god of the underworld
Dewi Lanjar - goddess who rules the North Sea
Dewi Ratih - goddess of the moon
Dewi Sri - goddess of rice and prosperity
Nyai Roro Kidul - goddess who rules the South Sea (Indian Ocean)
Batara Bayu - God of wind

Kombai
Refafu - god of the rainforest

Moluccans
Hainuwele - goddess who gives origin to vegetable crops

Sundanese
Nyai Pohaci Sanghyang Asri - goddess of rice and prosperity
Sunan Ambu - mother goddess

Toraja
Puang Matua - creator god
Pong Banggai di Rante - god of Earth
Indo' Ongon-Ongon - goddess of earthquakes
Pong Lalondong - god of death
Indo' Belo Tumbang - goddess of medicine

See also
Hyang, various gods and spirits
Hinduism in Indonesia
Sunda Wiwitan
Kejawen

References

Indonesian